The North Ossetia constituency (No.25) is a Russian legislative constituency covering the entirety of North Ossetia.

Members elected

Election results

1993

|-
! colspan=2 style="background-color:#E9E9E9;text-align:left;vertical-align:top;" |Candidate
! style="background-color:#E9E9E9;text-align:left;vertical-align:top;" |Party
! style="background-color:#E9E9E9;text-align:right;" |Votes
! style="background-color:#E9E9E9;text-align:right;" |%
|-
|style="background-color:"|
|align=left|Aleksandr Dzasokhov
|align=left|Independent
|
|55.96%
|-
|style="background-color:"|
|align=left|Beksoltan Dziov
|align=left|Independent
| -
|9.50%
|-
| colspan="5" style="background-color:#E9E9E9;"|
|- style="font-weight:bold"
| colspan="3" style="text-align:left;" | Total
| 
| 100%
|-
| colspan="5" style="background-color:#E9E9E9;"|
|- style="font-weight:bold"
| colspan="4" |Source:
|
|}

1995

|-
! colspan=2 style="background-color:#E9E9E9;text-align:left;vertical-align:top;" |Candidate
! style="background-color:#E9E9E9;text-align:left;vertical-align:top;" |Party
! style="background-color:#E9E9E9;text-align:right;" |Votes
! style="background-color:#E9E9E9;text-align:right;" |%
|-
|style="background-color:"|
|align=left|Aleksandr Dzasokhov (incumbent)
|align=left|Independent
|
|52.62%
|-
|style="background-color:"|
|align=left|Ruslan Gioyev
|align=left|Independent
|
|17.41%
|-
|style="background-color:"|
|align=left|Avram Dzotsiyev
|align=left|Communist Party
|
|13.77%
|-
|style="background-color:"|
|align=left|Viktor Ivanov
|align=left|Liberal Democratic Party
|
|6.49%
|-
|style="background-color:"|
|align=left|Margarita Kulova
|align=left|Independent
|
|1.11%
|-
|style="background-color:"|
|align=left|Vera Aliyeva
|align=left|Independent
|
|0.96%
|-
|style="background-color:#FE4801"|
|align=left|Valery Tsibirov
|align=left|Pamfilova–Gurov–Lysenko
|
|0.86%
|-
|style="background-color:#000000"|
|colspan=2 |against all
|
|3.98%
|-
| colspan="5" style="background-color:#E9E9E9;"|
|- style="font-weight:bold"
| colspan="3" style="text-align:left;" | Total
| 
| 100%
|-
| colspan="5" style="background-color:#E9E9E9;"|
|- style="font-weight:bold"
| colspan="4" |Source:
|
|}

1998

|-
! colspan=2 style="background-color:#E9E9E9;text-align:left;vertical-align:top;" |Candidate
! style="background-color:#E9E9E9;text-align:left;vertical-align:top;" |Party
! style="background-color:#E9E9E9;text-align:right;" |Votes
! style="background-color:#E9E9E9;text-align:right;" |%
|-
|style="background-color:"|
|align=left|Khazbi Bogov
|align=left|Independent
|
|39.40%
|-
|style="background-color:"|
|align=left|Khasan Albegonov
|align=left|Independent
|
|25.37%
|-
|style="background-color:"|
|align=left|Tamerlan Tsomayev
|align=left|Independent
|
|18.60%
|-
|style="background-color:#000000"|
|colspan=2 |against all
|
|3.23%
|-
| colspan="5" style="background-color:#E9E9E9;"|
|- style="font-weight:bold"
| colspan="3" style="text-align:left;" | Total
| -
| 100%
|-
| colspan="5" style="background-color:#E9E9E9;"|
|- style="font-weight:bold"
| colspan="4" |Source:
|
|}

1999

|-
! colspan=2 style="background-color:#E9E9E9;text-align:left;vertical-align:top;" |Candidate
! style="background-color:#E9E9E9;text-align:left;vertical-align:top;" |Party
! style="background-color:#E9E9E9;text-align:right;" |Votes
! style="background-color:#E9E9E9;text-align:right;" |%
|-
|style="background-color:"|
|align=left|Anatoly Chekhoyev
|align=left|Communist Party
|
|22.93%
|-
|style="background-color:"|
|align=left|Khazbi Bogov (incumbent)
|align=left|Independent
|
|21.25%
|-
|style="background-color:#3B9EDF"|
|align=left|Viktor Dedegkayev
|align=left|Fatherland – All Russia
|
|15.86%
|-
|style="background-color:"|
|align=left|Arkady Kadokhov
|align=left|Independent
|
|14.44%
|-
|style="background-color:"|
|align=left|Kazbek Khetagurov
|align=left|Independent
|
|4.92%
|-
|style="background-color:"|
|align=left|Amirkhan Torchinov
|align=left|Independent
|
|3.65%
|-
|style="background-color:"|
|align=left|Valery Revazov
|align=left|Independent
|
|2.46%
|-
|style="background-color:"|
|align=left|Ruslan Gioyev
|align=left|Independent
|
|2.19%
|-
|style="background-color:"|
|align=left|Ruslan Dzalayev
|align=left|Liberal Democratic Party
|
|1.14%
|-
|style="background-color:"|
|align=left|Georgy Katayev
|align=left|Independent
|
|0.72%
|-
|style="background-color:#020266"|
|align=left|Artur Kochiyev
|align=left|Russian Socialist Party
|
|0.65%
|-
|style="background-color:"|
|align=left|Ruslan Khugayev
|align=left|Independent
|
|0.62%
|-
|style="background-color:"|
|align=left|Oleg Datiyev
|align=left|Our Home – Russia
|
|0.61%
|-
|style="background-color:"|
|align=left|Badri Gazzati
|align=left|Independent
|
|0.42%
|-
|style="background-color:"|
|align=left|Inal Ostayev
|align=left|Independent
|
|0.34%
|-
|style="background-color:"|
|align=left|Uruzmag Karkusov
|align=left|Independent
|
|0.29%
|-
|style="background-color:#000000"|
|colspan=2 |against all
|
|6.62%
|-
| colspan="5" style="background-color:#E9E9E9;"|
|- style="font-weight:bold"
| colspan="3" style="text-align:left;" | Total
| 
| 100%
|-
| colspan="5" style="background-color:#E9E9E9;"|
|- style="font-weight:bold"
| colspan="4" |Source:
|
|}

2003

|-
! colspan=2 style="background-color:#E9E9E9;text-align:left;vertical-align:top;" |Candidate
! style="background-color:#E9E9E9;text-align:left;vertical-align:top;" |Party
! style="background-color:#E9E9E9;text-align:right;" |Votes
! style="background-color:#E9E9E9;text-align:right;" |%
|-
|style="background-color:#1042A5"|
|align=left|Arsen Fadzayev
|align=left|Union of Right Forces
|
|42.78%
|-
|style="background-color:"|
|align=left|Uruzmag Ogoyev
|align=left|Independent
|
|30.31%
|-
|style="background-color:"|
|align=left|Soslan Andiyev
|align=left|United Russia
|
|7.31%
|-
|style="background-color:"|
|align=left|Anatoly Chekhoyev (incumbent)
|align=left|Rodina
|
|5.17%
|-
|style="background-color:"|
|align=left|Vladimir Dzakhov
|align=left|Independent
|
|2.97%
|-
|style="background-color:#00A1FF"|
|align=left|Viktor Dedegkayev
|align=left|Party of Russia's Rebirth-Russian Party of Life
|
|1.09%
|-
|style="background-color:"|
|align=left|Marat Dzhioyev
|align=left|Independent
|
|0.87%
|-
|style="background-color:"|
|align=left|Slavik Ikayev
|align=left|Liberal Democratic Party
|
|0.83%
|-
|style="background-color:#C21022"|
|align=left|Elbrus Kallagaty
|align=left|Russian Pensioners' Party-Party of Social Justice
|
|0.70%
|-
|style="background-color:#000000"|
|colspan=2 |against all
|
|5.54%
|-
| colspan="5" style="background-color:#E9E9E9;"|
|- style="font-weight:bold"
| colspan="3" style="text-align:left;" | Total
| 
| 100%
|-
| colspan="5" style="background-color:#E9E9E9;"|
|- style="font-weight:bold"
| colspan="4" |Source:
|
|}

2016

|-
! colspan=2 style="background-color:#E9E9E9;text-align:left;vertical-align:top;" |Candidate
! style="background-color:#E9E9E9;text-align:leftt;vertical-align:top;" |Party
! style="background-color:#E9E9E9;text-align:right;" |Votes
! style="background-color:#E9E9E9;text-align:right;" |%
|-
|style="background-color:"|
|align=left|Artur Taymazov
|align=left|United Russia
|
|82.71%
|-
|style="background:"| 
|align=left|Gary Kuchiyev
|align=left|A Just Russia
|
|6.85%
|-
|style="background-color:"|
|align=left|Vladimir Pisarenko
|align=left|Rodina
|
|2.26%
|-
|style="background-color:"|
|align=left|Soslan Bestayev
|align=left|Liberal Democratic Party
|
|2.11%
|-
|style="background-color: " |
|align=left|Nugzar Musulbes
|align=left|Communists of Russia
|
|2.03%
|-
|style="background-color: " |
|align=left|Ruslan Gioyev
|align=left|Party of Growth
|
|1.09%
|-
|style="background-color:"|
|align=left|Fatima Khatsayeva
|align=left|The Greens
|
|1.06%
|-
|style="background:"| 
|align=left|Aleksey Khatagov
|align=left|Yabloko
|
|1.03%
|-
| colspan="5" style="background-color:#E9E9E9;"|
|- style="font-weight:bold"
| colspan="3" style="text-align:left;" | Total
| 
| 100%
|-
| colspan="5" style="background-color:#E9E9E9;"|
|- style="font-weight:bold"
| colspan="4" |Source:
|
|}

2021

|-
! colspan=2 style="background-color:#E9E9E9;text-align:left;vertical-align:top;" |Candidate
! style="background-color:#E9E9E9;text-align:left;vertical-align:top;" |Party
! style="background-color:#E9E9E9;text-align:right;" |Votes
! style="background-color:#E9E9E9;text-align:right;" |%
|-
|style="background-color:"|
|align=left|Artur Taymazov (incumbent)
|align=left|United Russia
|
|76.01%
|-
|style="background-color:"|
|align=left|Soslan Bestayev
|align=left|Liberal Democratic Party
|
|5.51%
|-
|style="background-color: " |
|align=left|Soslan Didarov
|align=left|A Just Russia — For Truth
|
|5.33%
|-
|style="background-color:"|
|align=left|Alan Makayev
|align=left|Communist Party
|
|3.95%
|-
|style="background-color:"|
|align=left|Kazbek Zoloyev
|align=left|Rodina
|
|3.21%
|-
|style="background-color: " |
|align=left|Nugzar Musulbes
|align=left|Communists of Russia
|
|2.46%
|-
|style="background-color:"|
|align=left|Tamerlan Bigayev
|align=left|The Greens
|
|1.72%
|-
| colspan="5" style="background-color:#E9E9E9;"|
|- style="font-weight:bold"
| colspan="3" style="text-align:left;" | Total
| 
| 100%
|-
| colspan="5" style="background-color:#E9E9E9;"|
|- style="font-weight:bold"
| colspan="4" |Source:
|
|}

Notes

References

Russian legislative constituencies
Politics of North Ossetia–Alania